Anders Søderblom (born 16 May 1963) is a Danish curler.

Teams

References

External links

Living people
1963 births
Danish male curlers
Danish curling champions